Chelsea Light Moving was an American alternative rock band formed in 2012 in New York City. The band consisted of Samara Lubelski, John Moloney, Thurston Moore, and Keith Wood. The band's eponymous debut album was released in 2013 on Matador Records.

History 

The band's songs featured prominent references to avant garde artists, the 1960s counterculture movement, and New York City. Thurston Moore chose the band's name due to its association with a moving company started by composer Philip Glass:

Current countercultural movements are also addressed by Chelsea Light Moving, notably the Occupy Wall Street on the song "Lip":

The band broke up in 2015, and Thurston Moore has since continued making music under his own name.

Discography 

Chelsea Light Moving (2013)

References

External links 

2012 establishments in New York City
Alternative rock groups from New York (state)
Musical groups established in 2012
Matador Records artists
Musical quartets
Sonic Youth